Bement may refer to:

People
 Alon Bement (1876–1954), an American artist, arts administrator, author, and teacher.
Arden L. Bement Jr. (born 1932), director of the U.S. National Science Foundation
 Linda Bement (1942–2018), Miss Universe, 1960
 Brian Bement (born 1993), American soccer player

Places
 Bement, Illinois, United States